This following is a list of lemmas (or, "lemmata", i.e. minor theorems, or sometimes intermediate technical results factored out of proofs). See also list of axioms, list of theorems and list of conjectures.

Algebra 

Abhyankar's lemma
Aubin–Lions lemma
Bergman's diamond lemma
Fitting lemma
Injective test lemma
Hua's lemma (exponential sums)
Krull's separation lemma
Schanuel's lemma (projective modules)
Schwartz–Zippel lemma
Shapiro's lemma
Stewart–Walker lemma (tensors)
Whitehead's lemma (Lie algebras)
Zariski's lemma

Algebraic geometry 
Abhyankar's lemma
Fundamental lemma (Langlands program)

Category theory 

 Five lemma
Horseshoe lemma
Nine lemma
Short five lemma
Snake lemma
Splitting lemma

Linear algebra 
 Matrix determinant lemma
 Matrix inversion lemma

Group theory 
Burnside's lemma also known as the Cauchy–Frobenius lemma
Frattini's lemma (finite groups)
Goursat's lemma
Mautner's lemma (representation theory)
Ping-pong lemma (geometric group theory)
Schreier's subgroup lemma
Schur's lemma (representation theory)
Zassenhaus lemma

Polynomials 

 Gauss's lemma (polynomials)
 Schwartz–Zippel lemma

Ring theory and commutative algebra 

Artin–Rees lemma
Hensel's lemma (commutative rings)
Nakayama lemma
Noether's normalization lemma
Prime avoidance lemma

Universal algebra 

 Jónsson's lemma

Analysis 

Fekete's lemma
Fundamental lemma of calculus of variations
Hopf lemma
Sard's lemma (singularity theory)
Stechkin's lemma (functional and numerical analysis)
Vitali covering lemma (real analysis)
Watson's lemma

Complex analysis 

Estimation lemma (contour integrals)
Hartogs's lemma (several complex variables)
Jordan's lemma
Lemma on the Logarithmic derivative
Schwarz lemma

Fourier analysis 

 Riemann–Lebesgue lemma

Differential equations 
Borel's lemma (partial differential equations)
Grönwall's lemma
Lax–Milgram lemma
Pugh's closing lemma
Weyl's lemma (Laplace equation) (partial differential equations)

Differential forms 

 Poincaré lemma of closed and exact differential forms

Functional analysis 

Cotlar–Stein lemma
Ehrling's lemma
Riesz's lemma

Mathematical series 

Abel's lemma
Kronecker's lemma

Numerical analysis 

Bramble–Hilbert lemma
Céa's lemma

Applied mathematics 

Danielson–Lanczos lemma (Fourier transforms)
Farkas's lemma (linear programming)
Feld–Tai lemma (electromagnetism)
Little's lemma (queuing theory)
Finsler's lemma

Control theory 
Finsler's lemma
Hautus lemma
Kalman–Yakubovich–Popov lemma

Computational complexity theory 

 Isolation lemma
 Switching lemma

Cryptography 
Forking lemma
Leftover hash lemma
Piling-up lemma (linear cryptanalysis)
Yao's XOR lemma

Formal languages 
Interchange lemma
Newman's lemma (term rewriting)
Ogden's lemma
Pumping lemma sometimes called the Bar-Hillel lemma

Microeconomics 

 Hotelling's lemma
 Shephard's lemma

Combinatorics 

Cousin's lemma (integrals)
Dickson's lemma
Littlewood–Offord lemma
Pólya–Burnside lemma
Sperner's lemma
Ky Fan lemma (combinatorial geometry)

Graph theory 

Berge's lemma
Counting lemma
Crossing lemma
Expander mixing lemma
Handshaking lemma
Kelly's lemma
Kőnig's lemma 
Szemerédi regularity lemma

Order theory 

Higman's lemma 
Ultrafilter lemma

Dynamical systems 

Barbalat's lemma
Kac's lemma (ergodic theory)

Geometry 

Shadowing lemma
Big-little-big lemma (mathematics of paper folding)
Gordan's lemma
Hilbert's lemma

Euclidean geometry 

Archimedes's lemmas
Johnson–Lindenstrauss lemma (Euclidean geometry)

Hyperbolic geometry 

 Margulis lemma

Metric spaces 

 Lebesgue's number lemma (dimension theory)

Riemannian geometry 

 Gauss's lemma (Riemannian geometry)

Mathematical logic 

Craig interpolation lemma
Diagonal lemma
Lindenbaum's lemma
Mostowski collapse lemma
Teichmüller–Tukey lemma also known as Tukey's lemma
Zorn's lemma; equivalent to the axiom of choice

Set theory 

Covering lemma
Delta lemma
Dynkin lemma
Fodor's lemma
Fixed-point lemma for normal functions (axiomatic set theory)
Moschovakis coding lemma
Rasiowa–Sikorski lemma

Number theory 

Bézout's lemma
Dwork's lemma
Euclid's lemma
Gauss's lemma
Hensel's lemma
Zolotarev's lemma
Siegel's lemma (Diophantine approximation)

Analytic number theory 

 Hua's lemma
 Vaughan's lemma

Diophantine equations 

Bhaskara's lemma

Sieve theory 

Fundamental lemma of sieve theory

Probability theory 

Borel–Cantelli lemma
Doob–Dynkin lemma
Itô's lemma (stochastic calculus)
Lovász local lemma
Stein's lemma
Wald's lemma

Statistics 
Glivenko–Cantelli lemma
Neyman–Pearson lemma
Robbins lemma

Measure theory 
Factorization lemma
Fatou's lemma
Frostman's lemma (geometric measure theory)
Malliavin's absolute continuity lemma

Topology 

 Lindelöf's lemma
 Urysohn's lemma
 Tube lemma

Differential topology 

 Morse lemma

Fixed-point theory 

 Knaster–Kuratowski–Mazurkiewicz lemma

Geometric topology 
Dehn's lemma

Topological groups and semigroups 

 Ellis–Numakura lemma (topological semigroups)

Lemmas